Xestia infimatis is a species of cutworm or dart moth in the family Noctuidae. It was described by Augustus Radcliffe Grote in 1880 and is found in North America.

The MONA or Hodges number for Xestia infimatis is 10972.

References

 Crabo, L.; Davis, M.; Hammond, P.; Mustelin, T. & Shepard, J. (2013). "Five new species and three new subspecies of Erebidae and Noctuidae (Insecta, Lepidoptera) from Northwestern North America, with notes on Chytolita Grote (Erebidae) and Hydraecia Guenée (Noctuidae)". ZooKeys. 264: 85-123.
 Hodges, Ronald W.; et al., eds. (1983). Check List of the Lepidoptera of America North of Mexico, xxiv + 284.
 Lafontaine, D. & Troubridge, J. (2010). "Two new species of the Euxoa westermanni species-group from Canada (Lepidoptera, Noctuidae, Noctuinae)". ZooKeys. 39: 255-262.
 Lafontaine, J. Donald & Schmidt, B. Christian (2010). "Annotated check list of the Noctuoidea (Insecta, Lepidoptera) of North America north of Mexico". ZooKeys, vol. 40, 1-239.
 Lafontaine, J. Donald & Dominick, R. B. et al., eds. (1998). "Noctuoidea Noctuidae (part) Noctuinae (part - Noctuini)". The Moths of America North of Mexico, fasc. 27.3, 348.

Further reading

 Arnett, Ross H. (2000). American Insects: A Handbook of the Insects of America North of Mexico. CRC Press.

External links

 Butterflies and Moths of North America
 NCBI Taxonomy Browser, Xestia infimatis

Xestia
Moths described in 1880